Elizabeta Karabolli (Karabolli was her maiden name, her married name is Elizabeta Nishica), born 1958, is an Albanian-American sport shooter, who became the European Champion in air pistol, representing Albania. She was the first ever European champion from Albania in any sport.

Sports career
She competed in the European Championship three times doing successively better each time. In 1977 she took home the Bronze Medal from Rome, Italy.  In 1978 she won the Silver Medal at the championships held at Hämeenlinna, Finland, and in 1979 she became the first Albanian to win a European Championship in pistol shooting when she took home the Gold Medal from Frankfurt am Main, Germany.

Naturalized as US citizen, and at the age of 50, Karabolli won the U.S. title in 2008 in the Women's Sport Pistol event.

References

External links
Eurolympic.org - Elizabeta Karabolli
- Elizabeta Nishica profile in ISSF website

1958 births
Albanian female sport shooters
Living people
ISSF pistol shooters
European champions in shooting
Albanian emigrants to the United States
American female sport shooters
European champions for Albania
People with acquired American citizenship
21st-century American women
University of Tirana alumni